Claire Frances Garrood (born 15 February 1988 in Rotorua) is a New Zealand cricketer who played three matches for the Northern Districts Spirit in the State League in 2002–03.

References

External links
 

1988 births
Living people
Sportspeople from Rotorua
New Zealand women cricketers
Northern Districts women cricketers